Conran is a surname. Notable people with the surname include:

Alexis Conran, British actor
Alys Conran, Welsh poet
H. L. Conran (1861–1924), Australian pastoralist and stockbroker
Jasper Conran (born 1959), fashion designer
John Conran (born 1958), Irish hurling player and manager
Kerry Conran (born 1964), costume designer, writer, director
Shirley Conran (born 1932), British novelist
Saint Conran of Orkney, 7th-century Bishop of the Orkneys.
Sebastian Conran (born c. 1950), product designer, son of Terence and Shirley
Sophie Conran, designer, sister of Sebastian
Sir Terence Conran (1931–2020), designer and writer
Tony Conran (1931–2013), Welsh poet

See also
Conran, Missouri, USA
Conran Octopus, British book publisher